This is a history of the 2009–10 season of the Dartmouth Big Green women's ice hockey team.

Off-season
July 13: Dartmouth forward Sarah Parsons has been named one of 41 skaters to participate in the 2009 USA Hockey Women's National Festival, which will serve as the selection camp for the 2009-10 U.S. National Team.
July 21: Dartmouth sophomore Reagan Fischer was recently selected as one of 42 players to be chosen to compete for a spot on the Canadian National Women's Under-22 Team. The camp will take place from August 7–14 at Father David Bauer Olympic Arena in Calgary.
August 3: The Dartmouth women's hockey team has traded venues with Boston College as the two teams have agreed to move their game on Jan. 27 to Thompson Arena. The game was originally scheduled to be played at Conte Forum. 
With the addition, the Big Green will be playing eight-consecutive home games from Jan. 15 to Feb. 6. The year kicks off with an exhibition matchup against McGill on Oct. 23 and Dartmouth opens the 2009-10 season on the road at Cornell on Oct. 30.

Exhibition

Regular season
October 5: The Dartmouth women’s hockey team was ranked No. 8 in the country. The USCHO.com officials revealed it in their first Top-10 Women’s Hockey Poll of the season. Dartmouth accumulated 40 points.
November 21: Against the Yale Bulldogs, Jenna Cunningham reached the 100-point milestone. She registered two goals as the Big Green triumphed by a 6-2 score.
January 23: Cunningham posted a career-high four goals in the 8-1 win over Union to snap a seven-game winless streak. This season she led the team with five game-winning goals.
February 6: Senior co-captain Sarah Parsons tallied her 150th career point and the Dartmouth women's hockey team came away with a 4-2 win over Brown on Senior Night at Thompson Arena. Parsons became the eighth Dartmouth player to accumulate 150 points. 
February 17: Sarah Parsons and Amanda Trunzo are among 45 nominees for the Patty Kazmaier Memorial Award.
February 26: Dartmouth alums Gillian Apps and Cherie Piper both won Olympic Gold medals with Canada's Women's Olympic Hockey team.
March 4: Sarah Parsons has been named a finalist for the ECAC Player of the Year Award.

Standings

Roster

Schedule

Player stats
Sarah Parsons posted 40 points on 20 goals and 20 assists as she led the Ivy League and ECAC Hockey. Her 20 goals were a career high. Parsons finished the year on a six-game point streak and led the team with 13 multi-point games. Parsons concluded her career with 156 total points, which places her eighth all-time (her 66 goals are top-10 in Big Green history, and her 90 assists tie with Carly Haggard ’03 for seventh all-time).
Jenna Cunningham was named to the New England Hockey Writers All-Star team (and the ECAC Second Team) for the third consecutive year. She reached a new career high with 18 goals. For the third consecutive year, she finished with at least 30 points. Cunningham finished her Dartmouth with 63 points and 62 assists for 125 points (ranking 16th overall in Big Green career scoring). By reaching 60 goals and 60 assists in her career, she became only one of 16 players in Big Green history to reach 100 points.

Skaters

Goaltenders

Awards and honors
Jenna Cunningham, Pre-Season All-ECAC Team
Jenna Cunningham, New England Hockey Writers All-Star Team
Camille Dumais, 2009-10 ECAC Hockey All-Rookie Team  
Sarah Parsons, Finalist for the 2009-10 ECAC Women's Best Defensive Forward Award 
Sarah Parsons, Frozen Four Skills Competition participant
Sarah Parsons, New England Hockey Writers All-Star Team
Sarah Toupal, ECAC Hockey Player of the Week (Week of February 8)

 Sarah Parsons, Forward, Senior, 2010 First Team All-Ivy

See also
2009–10 College Hockey America women's ice hockey season
2009–10 Eastern College Athletic Conference women's ice hockey season
2009–10 NCAA Division I women's ice hockey season

References

Dartmouth Big Green women's ice hockey seasons
Dartmouth
Big
Big